Razan Khalifa Al Mubarak is the Managing Director of the Environment Agency Abu Dhabi (EAD), and the Mohamed bin Zayed Species Conservation Fund as well as the current president of the International Union for Conservation of Nature.

Early life and background
Al Mubarak was born in 1979 in Abu Dhabi. She is the daughter of Khalifa Ahmed Abdulaziz Al-Mubarak, a former UAE ambassador to France who was assassinated in 1984 in Paris by the Abu Nidal Organization terrorist group and Sameera Al Khamis. Al Mubarak's grandfather was the Ahmed Abdulaziz Hamad Al-Mubarak, former judge and chairperson of the Shari'a Judicial Department in the Emirate of Abu Dhabi. Al Mubarak has three siblings: Rasha; Khaldoon Khalifa Al Mubarak, Managing Director of Mubadala Investment Company; and Mohamed Khalifa Al-Mubarak, Chairman of Abu Dhabi Tourism & Culture Authority. 

Al Mubarak holds an M.Sc. in Public Understanding of Environmental Change from the University College London, UK and a BA (Hons) in Environmental Studies and International Relations from Tufts University, Massachusetts, in the United States.

Al Mubarak is married to Badr Jafar, an Emirati businessperson. They are signatories to Bill and Melinda Gates' and Warren Buffett's "The Giving Pledge". They have publicly committed more than half of their wealth to philanthropy.

Career

In 2001, Al Mubarak helped establish Emirates Nature–WWF (EN–WWF)—a UAE affiliate of the WWF. She is its Managing Director.

In 2008, she became the founding Managing Director of the Mohamed bin Zayed Species Conservation Fund (MBZ Fund) – a UAE–based philanthropy supporting direct species conservation worldwide. 

She is  the managing director of the Environment Agency - Abu Dhabi (EAD). Appointed in 2011, she was the first woman to serve as secretary general and was promoted to its board of directors in 2018 by the crown prince of Abu Dhabi, Mohammed bin Zayed Al Nahyan. Under Al Mubarak, the EAD played a key role to reintroduce the scimitar-horned oryx into the wild in Chad. 

She is on the board of the Federal Authority for Nuclear Regulation and the International Center for Biosaline Agriculture. In addition, she serves as an Advisory Board member of the Rockefeller Foundation Economic Council on Planetary Health, the Cambridge Conservation Initiative, the Emirates Diplomatic Academy, a board member of Panthera, and Board Member to the Abu Dhabi Music & Arts Foundation (ADMAF).

In September 2021, she was elected as the president of International Union for Conservation of Nature for a 4-year term, becoming the second woman to be elected to lead the organization in the organization's history.

Awards
In 2013, the Abu Dhabi American Chamber of Commerce awarded Al Mubarak the "Women in Business" award for "demonstrating exemplary leadership and accomplishment by pushing barriers, overcoming challenges and setting an example of perseverance and professionalism."

In recognition of her global role in the field of environment and conservation, in 2018 the World Economic Forum selected her as one of the top 100 young sector leaders who contribute to building a more sustainable future for humankind, appointing her as Young Global Leader of the Forum.

Publications
Al Mubarak together with the advisory board of the MBZ Fund published an article in the journal Current Biology about the importance and benefits of species, which argued that species cannot be evaluated based on their economic value alone and should be understood for their cultural and inherent value as living organisms.

References

External links
 

Living people
1979 births
People from Abu Dhabi
Emirati businesspeople
Emirati chief executives
Giving Pledgers
21st-century philanthropists